"The Height of the Fighting (He-La-Hu)" is a song by British new wave and synth-pop band Heaven 17, released in 1982 as the fifth and final single from their debut album Penthouse and Pavement. It was written by Martyn Ware, Ian Craig Marsh and Glenn Gregory, and produced by Ware and Marsh.

"The Height of the Fighting" was remixed for its release as a single, with more aggressive drums plus brass both missing from the album track. The added horn section was performed by Beggar and Co. The song failed to make a chart appearance in the UK, while in New Zealand it reached No. 20.

Critical reception
Upon release, Red Starr of Smash Hits considered the single a "pointless rehash of an album track in a truly dreadful cover". They added: "The sooner BEF give up this dead-end synthetic funk and turn their talents back to writing classic stuff like "Dreams of Leaving" and "Radio WXJL" from Travelogue the better." Sunie of Record Mirror noted: "It doesn't quite match the magnificent "Penthouse and Pavement" single but it's pretty fab nonetheless."

In a retrospective review of the album, Dan LeRoy of AllMusic considered the song one of the "standout combinations of witty lyrics and whiplash electro-grooves". Tim O'Neil of PopMatters commented that the song "acts as both a satire of gung-ho militarism and a rallying cry for anti-capitalist insurgency".

Track listing
7" single (UK release)
"The Height of the Fighting (He-La-Hu)" - 2:55
"Honeymoon in New York" - 2:12

7" single (European release)
"The Height of the Fighting" - 2:59
"Penthouse and Pavement" - 6:23

7" single (New Zealand release)
"Height of the Fighting (He-La-Hu)" - 2:55
"He-La-Lu" - 2:58
"Honeymoon in New York" - 2:12

12" single
"Height of the Fighting (He-La-Hu)" - 2:55
"He-La-Lu" - 2:58
"Honeymoon in New York" - 2:12

Personnel
Heaven 17
 Glenn Gregory - lead vocals, backing vocals
 Martyn Ware - Linn LM-1 programming, backing vocals, producer
 Ian Craig Marsh - synthesizer, producer

Additional personnel
 Nick Patrick - assistant producer, engineer
 BilBo - mastering

Other
 Jill Mumford - artwork

Charts

References

1981 songs
1982 singles
Virgin Records singles
Heaven 17 songs
Songs written by Martyn Ware
Songs written by Glenn Gregory
Songs written by Ian Craig Marsh